Nikolay Konstantinovich Struchkov (born 6 January 1986, in Pokrovsk, Sakha Republic, Soviet Union) is Russian draughts player (Russian, Brazilian draughts and International draughts), four time world champion in draughts-64. International grandmaster (GMI) since 2007. Struchkov started playing draughts at the school where draughts were as a lesson. He graduated from the Faculty of Economics Peoples' Friendship University of Russia (Moscow) in 2010.

Sport achievements
World champion (Brazilian and Russian draughts) 2006, 2007, 2013, 2014.
Third place in European championship (Brazilian and Russian draughts) 2010.
Russian national champion (Russian draughts) 2013.

References

External links
Rating list Men on 01.01.2015//section-64

1986 births
Living people
Russian draughts players
Players of Russian draughts
Peoples' Friendship University of Russia alumni